Tetris is a 2023 biographical drama film directed by Jon S. Baird and written by Noah Pink. The film stars Taron Egerton and Toby Jones.

Tetris had its world premiere at SXSW Film Festival on March 15, 2023, and is scheduled to be released on March 31, 2023, by Apple TV+.

Premise
The true story of the high-stakes legal battle to secure the intellectual property rights to Tetris.

Cast
 Taron Egerton as Henk Rogers
 Toby Jones as Robert Stein
 Nikita Yefremov as Alexey Pajitnov
 Roger Allam as Robert Maxwell
 Anthony Boyle as Kevin Maxwell
 Togo Igawa as Hiroshi Yamauchi
 Ken Yamamura as Minoru Arakawa
 Ben Miles as Howard Lincoln
 Ayane Nagabuchi as Akemi Rogers
 Matthew Marsh as Mikhail Gorbachev
 Rick Yune as Larry

Production
In July 2020, it was reported that a biopic was being made about the making of Tetris, which will delve into the legal battles that took place during the Cold War over ownership of the game, with Jon S. Baird directing and Taron Egerton cast to portray the game publisher Henk Rogers. Egerton confirmed this report in an August 2020 interview, explaining that the film would mirror a tone similar to The Social Network. In November 2020, Apple TV+ acquired the film.

Filming began in Glasgow in December 2020, including Glasgow Prestwick Airport on the Ayrshire coast. In February 2021, filming took place in Aberdeen at locations including the University of Aberdeen's Zoology Building, which was used as the headquarters of Soviet firm Elorg, and Seamount Court which was used for several scenes. Production then returned to Glasgow for a few days, before wrapping in early March 2021. Reshoots took place in 2022, and the film's release was planned for later in the year.

Release 
The film premiered at the SXSW Film Festival on March 15, 2023. It will premiere on Apple TV+ on March 31, 2023.

Reception

References

See also 
 Tetris: The Games People Play: 2016 graphic novel on the same topic

External links 
 

2023 films
2023 drama films
2020s American films
2020s biographical drama films
2020s British films
American biographical drama films
Apple TV+ original films
British biographical drama films
Cold War films
Cultural depictions of Mikhail Gorbachev
Films about video games
Films directed by Jon S. Baird
Films produced by Matthew Vaughn
Films scored by Lorne Balfe
Films set in the 1980s
Films set in the Soviet Union
Films shot in Glasgow
Marv Studios films
Tetris